Joe Barton (born July 1, 1981 in San Marcos, California) is an American soccer player, currently without a club.

Career

College
Barton played college soccer at Point Loma Nazarene University and California State University, Northridge, where he was named Big West Goalkeeper of the Year in 2002. and captured two First Team All Conference awards. Barton finished his career with the Matadors with a trip to the NCAA Men’s National Tournament with a record of 14-5-2.

Professional
Barton was drafted in sixth round of the 2003 MLS SuperDraft by Los Angeles Galaxy, but never played a senior game for the team and was released to the Atlanta Silverbacks of the USL First Division at the end of the season. Barton recorded five wins in 11 games for the Silverback before being released by the Silverbacks on March 30, 2006.

After a brief stint with the Virginia Beach Mariners, and having spent the 2007 season with Chivas USA's reserves, Barton signed with Los Angeles Legends in the USL Premier Development League for the 2009 season.

References

1981 births
Living people
People from San Marcos, California
American soccer players
Cal State Northridge Matadors men's soccer players
LA Galaxy players
Atlanta Silverbacks players
Virginia Beach Mariners players
Chivas USA players
LA Laguna FC players
Soccer players from California
USL First Division players
USL League Two players
A-League (1995–2004) players
LA Galaxy draft picks
Association football goalkeepers